On November 20, 1798, a pair of French frigates, the L'insurgente and Volontaire, with some 80 guns in combined strength, captured an American 14-gun schooner, USS Retaliation. The ship was later recaptured on June 28, 1799, and the L'insurgente was captured the following month as well. The Retaliation was the only American warship captured during the war.

References

USS Retaliation
USS Retaliation